A multi-tool (or multitool) is a hand tool that combines several individual functions in a single unit. The smallest are credit-card or key sized units designed for carrying in a wallet or on a keyring, but others are designed to be carried in a trouser pocket or belt-mounted pouch.

History 
The idea of incorporating several tools in one unit is very old, dating back at least as far as Middle Roman times. Many of these were used for eating.

Pocket knives 

Among the earliest contemporary examples is the Swiss Army knife, as supplied by makers Victorinox and Wenger. The actual version supplied to the Swiss army includes a knife blade, a reamer, a bottle-opener–screwdriver–wire stripper, and a can-opener–screwdriver. Besides Victorinox and Wenger, many other manufacturers now make similar knives.

Other versions may include items like a nail file, tweezers, folding scissors, a tooth pick, a magnifying glass, screwdriver bits  and others. There are also versions that have special tools for specific sports or outdoor activities like golf, horseback riding, shooting, hunting or fishing.  Versions intended for cyclists may have a selection of allen (hex) keys, a selection of wrenches, screwdrivers, a spoke key, and a chain-breaker.

Folding multi-tools 

In 1983 Tim Leatherman sold his first "Pocket Survival Tool", ⁣ larger and more robust than a pocket-knife-based tool, and incorporating a set of needle-nosed pliers in a butterfly knife-style mechanism. Too large for most pockets, it came with a belt pouch.

Other multi-tools 

Other multi-tool functions include a hammer, LED light, lighter, tape measure and an assortment of screwdriver bits.

Multifunction tools may be specialized for use in certain activities.  Cyclists may carry a folding tool with multiple screwdriver bits or wrenches to allow adjustment of bicycle fasteners during a ride, or for repairing a broken chain.  For sport fishermen, a specialized multitool may combine common functions such as cutting fishing line, crimping weights, removing hooks or opening split rings. A specialized multitool may be used for adjustment, cleaning or minor repair of a firearm in field use.  The advantage of a multitool is saving weight and space over a set of individual tools to perform the same functions.

See also 
Multi-tool (powertool) or oscillating tool, an oscillating multi-tool (sometimes associated with the manufacturer Fein)
Die grinder, a rotary multi-tool (sometimes associated with the manufacturer Dremel)

References

Mechanical hand tools